The 2017–18 Lebanese Women's Football League was the 11th edition of the Lebanese Women's Football League since its inception in 2008. Zouk Mosbeh won their first title, with defending champions SAS coming second.

League table

Final four

See also
2017–18 Lebanese Women's FA Cup

References

External links
Goalzz.com
RSSSF.com

Lebanese Women's Football League seasons
W1
2017–18 domestic women's association football leagues